Lev Mosin (born 7 December 1992) is a Russian sprinter. He competed in the 4x400 metres relay event at the 2013 World Championships in Athletics.

References

1992 births
Living people
Russian male sprinters
Place of birth missing (living people)
World Athletics Championships athletes for Russia
21st-century Russian people